Spring City station was a former train station in the borough of Spring City, Pennsylvania. It served as a station for the Pennsylvania Railroad. It was demolished in 1982.

References 

Former Pennsylvania Railroad stations
Former railway stations in Chester County, Pennsylvania